Yves F. Meyer (born 19 July 1939) is a French mathematician. He is among the progenitors of wavelet theory, having proposed the Meyer wavelet. Meyer was awarded the Abel Prize in 2017.

Biography 
Born in Paris to a Jewish family, Yves Meyer studied at the Lycée Carnot in Tunis; he won the French General Student Competition (Concours Général) in Mathematics, and was placed first in the entrance examination for the École Normale Supérieure in 1957. He obtained his Ph.D. in 1966, under the supervision of Jean-Pierre Kahane.  The Mexican historian Jean Meyer is his cousin.

Yves Meyer taught at the Prytanée national militaire during his military service (1960–1963), then was a teaching assistant at the Université de Strasbourg (1963–1966), a professor at Université Paris-Sud (1966–1980), a professor at École Polytechnique (1980–1986), a professor at Université Paris-Dauphine (1985–1995), a senior researcher at the Centre national de la recherche scientifique (CNRS) (1995–1999), an invited professor at the Conservatoire National des Arts et Métiers (2000), a professor at École Normale Supérieure de Cachan (1999–2003), and has been a professor emeritus at Ecole Normale Supérieure de Cachan since 2004.

He was awarded the 2010 Gauss Prize for fundamental contributions to number theory, operator theory and harmonic analysis, and his pivotal role in the development of wavelets and multiresolution analysis. He also received the 2017 Abel Prize "for his pivotal role in the development of the mathematical theory of wavelets."

Publications

Awards and recognitions 
 He is a member of the Académie des Sciences since 1993.
 Meyer was an Invited Speaker at the ICM in 1970 in Nice, in 1983 in Warsaw, and in 1990 in Kyoto.
 In 2010, Yves Meyer was awarded the Carl Friedrich Gauss Prize.
 In 2012 he became a fellow of the American Mathematical Society.
 In 2017 he was awarded the Abel Prize for his pivotal role in developing the mathematical theory of wavelets.
 In 2020 he received the Princess of Asturias Award for Technical and Scientific Research.

See also 

 Wavelet
 Alex Grossmann
 Meyer wavelet
 Compressed sensing
 Harmonious set
 JPEG 2000
 Meyer set
 Ingrid Daubechies
 Jean Morlet

References

External links
Société Mathématiques de France : Lecture by Yves Meyer (2009)

Gauss prize 2010

1939 births
Living people
French mathematicians
20th-century French Jews
École Normale Supérieure alumni
Scientists from Paris
Members of the French Academy of Sciences
Fellows of the American Mathematical Society
Foreign associates of the National Academy of Sciences
Mathematical analysts
Abel Prize laureates
Academic staff of the University of Paris
Academic staff of École Polytechnique
Academic staff of Paris-Sud University